Baso Sangqu (born 21 April 1968, in Idutywa, Eastern Cape) was the South African Ambassador to the Kingdom of Belgium, the Grand Duchy of Luxembourg and the Mission to the European Union until  March 2019. Previously he was permanent representative to the United Nations from 17 March 2009 onwards, having first served as deputy.

Sangqu was a member of the International Criminal Court search committee to find a replacement for Luis Moreno-Ocampo.

In January 2012, Sangqu was the President of the United Nations Security Council.

Previous roles 
 1996-8, Chief Education Specialist in the National Department of Education
 2000, policy analyst and research consultant, Economic and Development Section of the Office of the President
 2000, Director for Social and Economic Programmes, African Multilateral Development and Cooperation, Department of Foreign Affairs
 2001, acting Chief Director for Marine, Environment, Science and Technology, Multilateral Development and Cooperation
 2001-2, acting Chief Director for Economic Development, Multilateral Development and Cooperation in the South African Department of Foreign Affairs
 2002-6, South Africa's ambassador to the African Union in Addis Ababa, Ethiopia
 2007-9, deputy permanent representative to the United Nations

Education 
 Bachelor's degree in commerce (economics and commercial law) from the University of Transkei
 Master's degree in development economics from Vanderbilt University in Nashville, Tennessee

References 

1968 births
Living people
People from Mbhashe Local Municipality
Xhosa people
South African diplomats
Vanderbilt University alumni
Permanent Representatives of South Africa to the United Nations
Permanent Representatives of South Africa to the African Union